Al Binaa is a Lebanese daily newspaper published in Beirut, Lebanon. Founded in 1958, it is published by the National Media Company (pronounced Al-Sharika Al-Qawmiya lil-I'lam), which is aligned with the Syrian Social Nationalist Party in Lebanon. The editor in chief is the Lebanese politician and former member of Parliament, Nasser Qandil.

The paper promoted cultural revival and featured the poems by Kamal Kheir Beik, Adonis, and Muhammad al-Maghut who were part of the emerging Arabic Modernist movement and were also the members of the Syrian Social Nationalist Party in Lebanon.

References

External links
Official website

1958 establishments in Lebanon
Arabic-language newspapers
Newspapers published in Beirut
Publications established in 1958
Daily newspapers published in Lebanon
Syrian Social Nationalist Party